Kader Asaad (Central Kurdish: قادر ئەسعەد, romanized: Qadir Es'ed; 4 April 1967) is a Kurdish oriental/arabesque recording artist (singer and songwriter) and record producer. He is the founder of Kader Asaad productions.

In his early years, Kader Asaad co-founded the Jala band in Erbil. The band released their first album in 1985. Following three successful years, they released a new album called "Jala Part 2" (1988). By 1992 they released a special album in order to celebrate the establishment of the Kurdistan Region's Parliament

In 1991 Kader Asaad released his first single album titled "Kader Assad 1991" which contained 10 tracks.

Due to the Iraqi Kurdish Civil War as well as other circumstances that were a result of Iraq's geopolitical situation, he emigrated to Sweden.

Single Albums Released

References

External links

1967 births
Living people